Jack Deere is an American charismatic pastor and theologian.

He was an associate professor of Old Testament at Dallas Seminary.

In the late 1980s, he abandoned his earlier theological position, announcing that he had experienced the charismatic gifts for himself through the ministry of John Wimber.

From 1988 to 1992 he pastored a Vineyard church, and pastored a Presbyterian church in Montana from 1994 to 1996. He remained in Montana for several years while traveling and speaking, and then moved back to the Dallas-Fort Worth Metroplex where he was pastor of Wellspring Church in North Richland Hills, a church now pastored by Dustin Aguilar.

Surprised by the Power of the Spirit
Deere's first book, published in 1993, Surprised by the Power of the Spirit, details his journey into charismatic Christianity, arguing against the cessationist position that the miraculous gifts of the Spirit have ceased. He deals with the arguments of B.B. Warfield and John MacArthur, among others. A companion book, Surprised by the Voice of God, argues for contemporary prophecy and supernatural revelation. He speaks about his experience of the Kansas City Prophets and the ministry of Paul Cain.

Surprised by the Voice of God
Using biblical and contemporary examples Deere argues that it has always been normal for God to speak to His children both from the Scripture and in their daily experience. This book was originally slated to be a chapter in Deere's first book, "Surprised by the Power of the Spirit", but Deere had so much material to cover, a second book was needed.

The Beginner's Guide to the Gift of Prophecy
C. Peter Wagner said this book “is the new operator’s manual for those who want to be participants, not just spectators, in today’s prophetic movement. This book will help you put it all together, get it up and running, and troubleshoot whatever problems arise.”

Biography
Deere was reared in Ft. Worth, Texas, the oldest of four children. When Jack was twelve years old, his father unexpectedly took his own life. The sorrow and great impact of this loss (which included great financial strain on the family) impelled him at first to be a rebel for a time, but then at age 17 to begin a relationship with Jesus Christ. The profound change in him revealed a bent toward scholarship, so he attended Texas Christian University in Fort Worth, where he majored in Philosophy. While there, he started working with the ministry of Young Life, leading high school students to the Lord.  

After graduation from TCU in 1971, he attended Dallas Theological Seminary (DTS) concentrating in Greek and Hebrew study of the Bible, and earning both a Master and a Doctor of Theology degree. In 1976, he was invited to join the DTS faculty, teaching Hebrew and Old Testament. During his tenure at Dallas Seminary, he started and pastored two churches.

In 1986, after a thorough re-examination of the scriptures, Deere reversed his position on the supernatural gifts of the Holy Spirit (such as healing and prophecy), arguing that all the gifts of the Spirit are for today, and did not cease with the formation of the New Testament canon. Later on, this experience became the basis of his two companion books, Surprised by the Power of the Spirit and Surprised by the Voice of God.  

At the end of 1987, Deere left the Dallas Seminary faculty and joined the staff of the Vineyard Christian Fellowship Church in Anaheim, California, pastored at that time by his friend, Vineyard movement founder John Wimber.

In 1992, Deere left the Anaheim Vineyard for Montana, where he began a ministry as a writer and conference-speaker.

Tragically, in December 2000, his 23-year-old son Scott, who was home for Christmas, ended his life in the family home after many years of struggling with drug and alcohol addiction. This led to an almost immediate relocation back to Texas for a long period of recovery.  

In the spring of 2004, Deere began Wellspring Church in North Richland Hills, Texas, a church he pastored for many years. In his book "Even in Our Darkness," Deere writes at length about his wife Leesa's struggle with alcoholism and his own personal failures. More recently, he relinquished all leadership positions to be able to devote himself to full-time care of his wife, and they moved from Colleyville, Texas to Tennessee. 

The Deeres have two grown children, Stephen and Alese.

References

Books
 Deere, Jack, Surprised by the Power of the Spirit (Zondervan, 1993)
 Deere, Jack, Surprised by the Voice of God (Zondervan, 1996)
 Deere, Jack, The Beginner's Guide to the Gift of Prophecy (Regal, 2008)
 Deere, Jack, Even in Our Darkness: A Story of Beauty in a Broken Life (memoir, Zondervan, March 6, 2018)

Sermon given January 13, 2012 at the 12th Annual Winter conference of the Anglican Missions in the Americas (AMIA) Morning Worship, Houston TX: 
"The Three Distinct Phases of My Life With God."
http://www.virtueonline.org/houston-tx-three-distinct-phases-my-life-god

External links
 Jack Deere's church website

Year of birth missing (living people)
Living people
American Christian theologians
American Christian mystics
20th-century Protestant theologians
20th-century Christian mystics
Protestant writers
American Charismatics
Protestant mystics
Dallas Theological Seminary alumni